Pedicularis bhutanomuscoides is a species of flowering plant endemic to Bhutan. It occurs on open slopes with Rhododendron scrub.

References

Endemic flora of Bhutan
Flora of Bhutan
bhutanomuscoides